Francisco Álvarez (December 26, 1892 in Buenos Aires – April 21, 1960 in Lanús) was an Argentine film and theater actor of the classic era of Argentine cinema.

Entering film in 1937 he appeared in 54 films between then and his death in 1960, appearing in films such as Al marido hay que seguirlo with Mapy Cortés and Pedro Quartucci in 1948.

Selected filmography
Educating Niní (1940)
 A Thief Has Arrived (1940)
 The Song of the Suburbs (1941)
 Girls Orchestra (1941)
 Saint Candida (1945)
 Modern Husbands (1948)
 That's the Woman I Want (1951)

References

External links
Francisco Álvarez at argentinafilms.com
 

1892 births
1960 deaths
Argentine male film actors
Argentine male stage actors
Male actors from Buenos Aires
20th-century Argentine male actors
Burials at La Chacarita Cemetery